The Saturn Banks Project comprises six natural gas reservoirs and gas production facilities in the southern North Sea, 35-55 km north east of Bacton, Norfolk. The fields are under development and first gas is due in 2022.

The fields 
The Saturn Banks Project includes the Blythe, Elgood, Southwark, Elland, Nailsworth and Goddard gas fields in the UK offshore Quadrants 48 and 49.

Details of the gas fields is summarised in the table.

Development 
The Saturn Banks Project is being developed by IOG plc as the project operator; it holds a 50% stake and CalEnergy Resources (UK) also holds a 50% stake.

The gas fields are developed in stages. The first phase comprised the Blythe, Elgood and Southwark fields. These are developed by offshore platforms, subsea wellheads and pipelines. Details are summarised in the table.  

The pipelines from Blythe and Southwark platforms are tied into the reused Thames to Bacton 24-inch pipeline (PL370), renamed the Saturn Banks Pipeline System.

In addition to the offshore development the Saturn Banks reception facilities at Bacton gas terminal were installed.

Later phases of the Saturn Banks Project will include the Nailsworth, Elland and Goddard gas fields. Nailsworth is projected to be produced through the Southwark platform.

See also 

 Thames gas field
 Bacton gas terminal
 List of oil and gas fields of the North Sea

References 

North Sea energy
Natural gas fields in the United Kingdom